Astragalus amphioxys, common name crescent milkvetch, is a plant found in the American southwest.

Uses
The Zuni use the plant medicinally.  The fresh or dried root is chewed by a medicine man before sucking snakebite and poultice applied to wound.

References

amphioxys
Flora of the Southwestern United States
Plants used in traditional Native American medicine